John Thomas Bryan (14 September 1877–1940) was an English footballer who played in the Football League for Wolverhampton Wanderers.

References

1877 births
1940 deaths
English footballers
Association football forwards
English Football League players
Wolverhampton Wanderers F.C. players